King of Pro-Wrestling (2019) was a professional wrestling event promoted by New Japan Pro-Wrestling. It took place on October 14, 2019 at the Ryōgoku Kokugikan in Tokyo, Japan. It was the eighth, and the final event under the King of Pro-Wrestling name.

Production

Background
Due to the events of the Typhoon Hagibis, Jon Moxley and Zack Sabre Jr. were unable to fly in to Japan, prompting last minute changes to the card.

Storylines
King of Pro-Wrestling featured professional wrestling matches that involved different wrestlers from pre-existing scripted feuds and storylines. Wrestlers portrayed villains, heroes, or less distinguishable characters in the scripted events that built tension and culminated in a wrestling match or series of matches.

At the Best of the Super Juniors 26 finals on June 5, Jon Moxley defeated Juice Robinson to win the IWGP United States Heavyweight Championship. Later, Moxley and Robinson would wrestle again in the G1 Climax on August 11, with Robinson winning and thereby preventing Moxley from winning the tournament. Moxley subsequently challenged Robinson to a No Disqualification match for the United States Championship at King of Pro-Wrestling. However, Moxley was unable to attend the event due to travel issues stemming from Typhoon Hagibis. Per NJPW rules, he was stripped of the title and a match between Robinson and Lance Archer for the vacant title was scheduled instead.

On night three of the G1 Climax on July 14, Evil defeated Kota Ibushi in a block match. Despite the loss, Ibushi went on to win the tournament, becoming the holder of the Tokyo Dome IWGP Heavyweight Championship challenge rights certificate. In a post-tournament interview, Ibushi declared that he wanted to defend the certificate against those who had beaten him, setting up a match between the two for this event.

Results

See also
2019 in professional wrestling
List of NJPW pay-per-view events

References

External links
King of Pro-Wrestling at NJPW.co.jp

2019
2019 in professional wrestling
October 2019 events in Japan
2019 in Tokyo